Washington is an 'L' station on the CTA's Blue Line.

History
Washington opened on February 25, 1951, as part of the Milwaukee-Dearborn subway, the second of subways to be constructed in Chicago. The station was entirely renovated from 1982 to 1984. As constructed, the station had two stairways to a lower level pedestrian transfer tunnel to the Washington station in the State Street Subway (now part of the Red Line). At midnight on October 23, 2006, the lower level transfer tunnel to the Red Line closed as part of the construction of a planned superstation under what is commonly referred to as Block 37.  On November 20, 2009, the pedway linking the Lake station's unpaid area to that of Washington reopened  and in May 2013, the CTA provided a farecard transfer through the pedway between the stations.

This is the northernmost of the three stations on one long continuous platform underneath Dearborn Street, with the stops at Monroe and Jackson being the other two.

Service
It is the second station in the Loop from O'Hare and the fourth from Forest Park. Blue Line trains serve Washington 24 hours a day every day; trains operate every 7 to 10 minutes during rush hour and midday operation, with longer headways of up to 30 minutes at night. 2,335,025 passengers boarded at Washington in 2010. Two mezzanines exist at this station: Randolph-Washington, open 24 hours a day, providing a farecard transfer to the Red Line, and access to Daley Plaza. The second mezzanine is Washington-Madison, which is also open 24 hours a day.

Bus connections
CTA
 J14 Jeffery Jump 
 20 Madison (Owl service) 
 22 Clark 
 24 Wentworth (Weekdays only) 
 28 Stony Island (Weekday Rush Hours only) 
 36 Broadway 
 56 Milwaukee 
 60 Blue Island/26th (Owl Service) 
 62 Archer (Owl Service) 
 124 Navy Pier 
 130 Museum Campus (Summer Service Only) 
 157 Streeterville/Taylor (Weekdays only)

Notes and references

Notes

References

External links
Washington/Dearborn Station Page
Madison Street/Washington Street entrance from Google Maps Street View
Randolph Street/Washington Street entrance from Google Maps Street View

CTA Blue Line stations
Railway stations in the United States opened in 1951
1951 establishments in Illinois